Sir Lees Knowles, 1st Baronet   (16 February 1857 – 7 October 1928) was a British barrister, military historian and Conservative politician.

Early life
Knowles was the son of John Knowles and Elizabeth Lees of Green Bank, Oldham, Lancashire whose family owned Andrew Knowles and Sons, collieries in the Irwell Valley. He was educated at Rugby School and at Trinity College, Cambridge. He was a prominent athlete at both institutions and became president of the Cambridge University Athletics Club. He studied law, and was called to the bar at Lincoln's Inn in 1882.

Career

Politics
Knowles was involved in Unionist politics, and stood unsuccessfully for the Conservatives at Leigh in the 1885 general election. In the following year, another general election was held, and he was returned as Member of Parliament for Salford West.

From 1887 to 1892 Knowles held an appointment as unpaid parliamentary secretary to Charles Ritchie, President of the Local Government Board.  On 24 April 1890, he brought a motion before the House of Commons and was subsequently appointed to formulate the Royal Commission on Tuberculosis.

Knowles remained unpaid parliamentary secretary when Ritchie became President of the Board of Trade in 1895. From 1896 to 1906 he was Second Church Estates Commissioner. He was created a baronet, "of Westwood in the County of Lancaster", in the 1903 Birthday Honours. In December 1904, he was knighted as a Knight of Grace of the Order of Saint John (KStJ).

His parliamentary career came to an end when he lost his seat at the 1906 general election.

Military
Knowles had a great interest in military history, and wrote a number of books on the life of Napoleon. In 1912 he made a bequest to his alma mater, Trinity College. This established the Lees Knowles Lectureship, an annual series of talks on military science given by distinguished military and naval figures.

He held a commission as an officer in the Volunteer Force and its successor the Territorial Force, reaching the rank of lieutenant-colonel. After a stint as Honorary Colonel of the 3rd (Volunteer) battalion of the Lancashire Fusiliers, he was on 14 May 1902 appointed lieutenant-colonel in command of the battalion. At various times he commanded the 3rd, 7th and 8th battalions of the Lancashire Fusiliers. He subsequently became the vice-chairman of the Lancashire Territorial Army Association.

Knowles was a philanthropist, supporting a number of charities, notably the Guinness Trust for Housing the Poor. He died in on 7 October 1928, aged 71, at his home in Westwood, Pendlebury.

Family
In 1915, he married Lady Nina Ogilvy-Grant, youngest daughter of Francis Ogilvy-Grant, 10th Earl of Seafield. Lady Nina was presumably the Lady Nina Ogilvy-Grant who appeared at a meeting of the Conservative and Unionist Women's Franchise Association on 11 May 1909 at 52 Portland Place in London, as reported by Votes for Women, the organ of the Women's Social and Political Union. They had no children.

Memorials
Two roads in Llandudno, North Wales, are named in his honour: Lees Road and Knowles Road.

Arms

Works 
 Lees Knowles, A day with corps-students in Germany

As editor

References

'Obituary: Sir Lees Knowles. A Life of Public Service.', The Times, 8 October 1928, p. 18

External links 
 

1857 births
1928 deaths
Conservative Party (UK) MPs for English constituencies
UK MPs 1886–1892
UK MPs 1895–1900
UK MPs 1900–1906
Alumni of Trinity College, Cambridge
People educated at Rugby School
Members of Lincoln's Inn
Lancashire Fusiliers officers
Baronets in the Baronetage of the United Kingdom
Knights of Grace of the Order of St John
Commanders of the Royal Victorian Order
Members of the Parliament of the United Kingdom for Salford West
Church Estates Commissioners